Malcolm Robert Michael (born 24 June 1977) is a Papua New Guinean-born former Australian rules footballer.   He is notable for his successful professional career in the Australian Football League.  In a career spanning 238 games and three clubs in two Australian states he is best known as a triple premiership full-back with the Brisbane Lions.  Michael is recognised as being one of the best Queensland produced Australian rules footballers of all time, being named on the AFL Queensland Team of the 20th Century.

He is possibly the only Australian rules footballer who is better known in a country other than Australia, maintaining a high profile in Papua New Guinea, and he is credited by many to have inspired the boom in playing numbers of Australian rules football in Papua New Guinea. In April 2009, The Guardian described him as one of Papua New Guinea's "living national icons", along with politician Michael Somare and philosopher Bernard Narokobi.

Early life
Michael was born in Papua New Guinea.  His mother Alice is from Delena, Central Province a village near Port Moresby. and his father Peter is a Melbourne-born civil engineer and former Ormond Amateurs (VAFA) player. Peter was instrumental in developing AFL in PNG and founded the Bomana demons FC near Sogeri in Port Moresby.  Michael moved to Brisbane with his parents at the age of 3 and later played junior football in Brisbane with the Kenmore Bears.  He attended Kenmore South State School before finishing off his schooling at St Peters Lutheran College, Brisbane, Australia.

As a teenager, Michael was recruited by Queensland Australian Football League club Morningside. While at that club he was invited to train with the Brisbane Bears Australian Football League (AFL) club, with a view to potentially drafting him—an exciting prospect for him as he was a Bears supporter at the time. However, the Bears did not draft him, with Melbourne-based rival club Collingwood drafting him to their rookie list in 1996.

AFL career

Collingwood Football Club
Michael debuted in 1997 as the first player in the AFL to be elevated to the seniors from the rookie list. He finished eighth in the club champion voting and earned a Norwich Rising Star Award nomination.

In 1999, Michael was notable as being the full-back playing on Sydney Swans champion full-forward Tony Lockett, in the match when Lockett kicked his 1300th career goal to become the highest goalkicker in the league's history. Michael managed 61 games with the Magpies, injuries grounding his rise in each of his five seasons at Victoria Park. Unfortunately, the Collingwood faithful never saw the best of him. 

At the end of 2000 he was traded to the Brisbane Lions along with a draft pick for Jarrod Molloy.

Brisbane Lions
Michael debuted for the Brisbane Lions in 2001.  At the Lions he bulked up substantially and became one of the AFL's strongest players, and was a fullback.  Michael fitted in well with the other Lions hard men, such as Chris Scott and Chris Johnson under the guidance of coach Leigh Matthews.

He played fullback in each of the Lions' three successive premierships in 2001, 2002 and 2003, achieving his first premiership in his first year with the club.

Surprisingly during these years, despite being unanimously regarded as the most consistent and fullback in the competition, he was unlucky to miss All-Australian selection.  It is widely believed that this is due to the majority of his work being one percenters not generally credited by umpires or the stat sheets as much as actual possessions. Michael played 140 out of a possible 145 games for the Lions during his six years with the club, as well as all pre-season competition games and two International rules series games against Ireland in 2004.

In 2005, Michael was involved in a much publicised incident with Nick Riewoldt when he and Chris Scott both "tested" the St Kilda player's broken collarbone.  The incident caused significant controversy. A fortnight later, he played his 100th club game for the Brisbane Lions, but the Lions suffered an embarrassing six-point loss to eventual premiers  after they had led by 32 points at the final change.

In the Round 14, 2006 game against Melbourne, Michael conceded a rushed behind in an unorthodox and notable fashion. He is not the first player to deliberately rush a behind with a kick between the goal posts, however his emphatic kick from over 10 metres out was quite remarkable.  This attracted wide scrutiny in the media and was oft-replayed.

Michael played his 200th AFL game in the penultimate round of the 2006 AFL season against Sydney, lining up on Barry Hall, who was also playing his 200th AFL game. Brisbane lost the match by 57 points.

Michael announced his retirement on 5 October 2006 at only 29 years of age.

After his retirement it was speculated that he wanted return to Melbourne to base himself there while playing football semi-professionally for a local club.

Comeback
However, on 24 November 2006, Michael shocked the football community by reconsidering his retirement. To the anger of the Brisbane Lions, he announced that he had been signed by the Essendon Football Club and had reached an agreement whereby he will be selected by them in the pre-season draft for the 2007 season.

Essendon Football Club
Michael debuted with Essendon wearing the number 22 guernsey which was vacated by Tristan Cartledge, who was delisted by the Bombers at the end of season 2006. 
In the 2007 and 2008 seasons, he has since featured in the backline alongside veteran Dustin Fletcher and emerging youngster Paddy Ryder.

Second retirement
On 15 August 2008 Michael announced his second retirement from AFL football but would play until season's end. In the Round 22 match, Essendon vs St Kilda, Michael was chaired off the ground by the players at the end of the match.

Statistics

|-
|- style="background-color: #EAEAEA"
! scope="row" style="text-align:center" | 1997
|style="text-align:center;"|
| 48 || 13 || 0 || 2 || 46 || 54 || 100 || 29 || 26 || 0.0 || 0.2 || 3.5 || 4.2 || 7.7 || 2.2 || 2.0
|-
! scope="row" style="text-align:center" | 1998
|style="text-align:center;"|
| 48 || 16 || 3 || 2 || 84 || 79 || 163 || 42 || 19 || 0.2 || 0.1 || 5.3 || 4.9 || 10.2 || 2.6 || 1.2
|- style="background-color: #EAEAEA"
! scope="row" style="text-align:center" | 1999
|style="text-align:center;"|
| 48 || 17 || 6 || 5 || 94 || 107 || 201 || 73 || 19 || 0.4 || 0.3 || 5.5 || 6.3 || 11.8 || 4.3 || 1.1
|-
! scope="row" style="text-align:center" | 2000
|style="text-align:center;"|
| 48 || 15 || 14 || 8 || 75 || 80 || 155 || 67 || 17 || 0.9 || 0.5 || 5.0 || 5.3 || 10.3 || 4.5 || 1.1
|- style="background-color: #EAEAEA"
|style="text-align:center;background:#afe6ba;"|2001†
|style="text-align:center;"|
| 15 || 24 || 2 || 3 || 89 || 119 || 208 || 64 || 23 || 0.1 || 0.1 || 3.7 || 5.0 || 8.7 || 2.7 || 1.0
|-
|style="text-align:center;background:#afe6ba;"|2002†
|style="text-align:center;"|
| 15 || 25 || 1 || 1 || 120 || 106 || 226 || 80 || 32 || 0.0 || 0.0 || 4.8 || 4.2 || 9.0 || 3.2 || 1.3
|- style="background-color: #EAEAEA"
|style="text-align:center;background:#afe6ba;"|2003†
|style="text-align:center;"|
| 15 || 23 || 0 || 2 || 119 || 79 || 198 || 91 || 21 || 0.0 || 0.1 || 5.2 || 3.4 || 8.6 || 4.0 || 0.9
|-
! scope="row" style="text-align:center" | 2004
|style="text-align:center;"|
| 15 || 25 || 0 || 0 || 138 || 86 || 224 || 80 || 36 || 0.0 || 0.0 || 5.5 || 3.4 || 9.0 || 3.2 || 1.4
|- style="background-color: #EAEAEA"
! scope="row" style="text-align:center" | 2005
|style="text-align:center;"|
| 15 || 22 || 1 || 0 || 131 || 65 || 196 || 84 || 24 || 0.0 || 0.0 || 6.0 || 3.0 || 8.9 || 3.8 || 1.1
|-
! scope="row" style="text-align:center" | 2006
|style="text-align:center;"|
| 15 || 21 || 1 || 2 || 139 || 101 || 240 || 109 || 30 || 0.0 || 0.1 || 6.6 || 4.8 || 11.4 || 5.2 || 1.4
|- style="background-color: #EAEAEA"
! scope="row" style="text-align:center" | 2007
|style="text-align:center;"|
| 22 || 22 || 2 || 1 || 111 || 142 || 253 || 82 || 31 || 0.1 || 0.0 || 5.0 || 6.5 || 11.5 || 3.7 || 1.4
|-
! scope="row" style="text-align:center" | 2008
|style="text-align:center;"|
| 22 || 15 || 3 || 1 || 58 || 102 || 160 || 49 || 16 || 0.2 || 0.1 || 3.9 || 6.8 || 10.7 || 3.3 || 1.1
|- class="sortbottom"
! colspan=3| Career
! 238
! 33
! 27
! 1204
! 1120
! 2324
! 850
! 294
! 0.1
! 0.1
! 5.1
! 4.7
! 9.8
! 3.6
! 1.2
|}

Post AFL
Following his AFL career, Michael made a switch to semi-professional country football, playing with Nilma Darnum Bombers in the Ellinbank and District Football League a club with a 14-year finals drought in 2009 to win the premiership side

At the end of 2009, Michael coached a combined Under 23 Pacific Islands team to victory against an Under 23 North Queensland representative side.

In 2010 Michael was appointed caretaker coach of the Papua New Guinea National Senior Team, before representing the team as a player in the pre-season campaign against AFL Cairns clubs. He played for Heywood in the Western Border Football League that year. Mal signed to play with his fathers former VAFA club Ormond for the 2015 season, helping to take the club to the grand final.

Aberfeldie Football Club: EDFL Career
In 2011, Mal Michael joined Essendon District Football League side Aberfeldie Football Club. On 3 October 2012 Mal Michael was officially re-appointed as coach of Aberfeldie for Season 2013, albeit to concentrate solely on coaching and not play.

Papua New Guinean celebrity
Michael was the first Papua New Guinean to play senior AFL football, acting as an ambassador for the game when he visits his homeland. He is possibly the only AFL player who is better known in a country other than Australia. He has appeared on a series of biscuit commercials in PNG as "the secret of Mal's success". In 2004, he hosted a popular football segment on a weekly PNG television show.

In early 2006, he established the Mal Michael Foundation, aimed at raising money to help give young Papua New Guineans the opportunity to play Aussie rules.

In 2007 Michael made a strategic deal with mining company Hannans Reward (ASX:HNR) aimed at appealing the company to the Papua New Guinea market.
Michael's consultancy company M&M Synergy Ltd, deals in the natural resource sector in Papua New Guinea. They represent land owner incorporated companies to help them develop their assets. M&M Synergy Ltd specialise in joint venture projects and capital raising for timber, mining and petroleum projects.

Career highlights
Brisbane Lions premiership side 2001, 2002, 2003
AFL Queensland Team of the Century 2003
 Rushing a behind in Round 14, 2006
International Rules series 2004 Goalkeeper
Brisbane Lions Team of the (first) Decade 2006

See also
Australian rules football in Papua New Guinea

References

External links 

Mal Michael's profile on essendonfc.com.au

Mal wants to help PNG

1977 births
Living people
VFL/AFL players born outside Australia
Essendon Football Club players
Brisbane Lions players
Brisbane Lions Premiership players
Collingwood Football Club players
Morningside Australian Football Club players
Heywood Football Club players
Australian rules footballers from Queensland
Papua New Guinean emigrants to Australia
People from the National Capital District (Papua New Guinea)
Australia international rules football team players
Papua New Guinean players of Australian rules football
Three-time VFL/AFL Premiership players